Vetoshnikovo is a rural locality (a village) in Ufa, Bashkortostan, Russia. The population was 260 as of 2010. There are 2 streets.

Geography 
Vetoshnikovo is located 20 km west of Ufa. Marmylevo is the nearest rural locality.

References 

Rural localities in Ufa urban okrug